Fredrick John William Rice (November 10, 1918 – March 8, 2005) was an American football coach.  He served as head football coach at Colgate University for two seasons, from 1957 until 1958, compiling a record of 4–14.  After leaving Colgate, Rice was the head coach at Nicolet High School in Glendale, Wisconsin from 1961 to 1975, where he posted a 70–53–9 record and won a Braveland Conference championship in 1966.

Head coaching record

College

References

External links
 Fred Rice's obituary
 

1918 births
2005 deaths
American football fullbacks
Colgate Raiders football coaches
Marquette Golden Avalanche football coaches
Marquette Golden Avalanche football players
High school football coaches in Wisconsin